Kode is a locality situated in Kungälv Municipality, Västra Götaland County, Sweden. It had 1,380 inhabitants in 2010.

Sports
The following sports clubs are located in Kode:

 Kode IF

References 

Populated places in Västra Götaland County
Populated places in Kungälv Municipality